The 22841 / 22842 Santragachi - Chennai Central Antyodaya Express is a superfast train belonging to South Eastern Railway zone that runs between Santragachi Junction and  Chennai Central.

It is being operated with 22841/22842 train numbers on a weekly basis.

Coach composition 

The trains is completely general coaches trains designed by Indian Railways with features of LED screen display to show information about stations, train speed etc. Vending machines for water. Bio toilets in compartments as well as CCTV cameras and mobile charging points and toilet occupancy indicators.

Service 

The 22841/Santragachi - Chennai Central Antyodaya Express has an average speed of 60 km/hr and covers 1655 km in 27 hrs 45 mins.
 
The 22842/Chennai Central - Santragachi Antyodaya Express has an average speed of 63 km/hr and covers 1655 km in 26 hrs 15 mins.

Route and halts 

The important halts of the train are:

Schedule

Direction reversal

Train reverses its direction one time:

Traction

After, both trains are hauled by a Lallaguda Loco Shed or Vijayawada Loco Shed based WAP 4.

See also 
 Antyodaya Express

Notes

References 

Antyodaya Express trains
Rail transport in West Bengal
Rail transport in Odisha
Rail transport in Andhra Pradesh
Rail transport in Tamil Nadu
Railway services introduced in 2018